Maurice Auguste Schilles (25 February 1888 – 20 December 1957) was a French track cyclist. At the 1908 Olympics he won a gold medal in the tandem, together with André Auffray, and a silver in the 5000 m event. He also competed in the sprint; in the final, the time limit was exceeded, resulting in the race being declared void and no medals being awarded. According to the official report he won the race by inches. In the 660 yards event he was eliminated in the first round. In the team pursuit competition he was a member of the French team that was eliminated in the first round.

Schilles was a mechanic, and built lightweight bikes. He started racing in 1905, mostly in the sprint, and in 1907 won his first Paris championship. In 1909 he won a bronze medal at the world championships. He raced professionally in 1919–1928 and won the national sprint title in 1923, as well as two medals at the world championships in 1924 and 1925. Besides cycling, he competed nationally in swimming, boxing and running.

References

1888 births
1957 deaths
French male cyclists
French track cyclists
Olympic cyclists of France
Cyclists at the 1908 Summer Olympics
Olympic gold medalists for France
Olympic silver medalists for France
Olympic medalists in cycling
People from Puteaux
Medalists at the 1908 Summer Olympics
Sportspeople from Hauts-de-Seine
Cyclists from Île-de-France